Mehmed Reshid (8 February 1873 – 6 February 1919) was an Ottoman physician, official of the Committee of Union and Progress, and governor of the Diyarbekir Vilayet (province) of the Ottoman Empire during World War I. He is infamous for organizing the wartime genocides of the Armenian and Assyrian communities of Diyarbekir. According to historian Hans-Lukas Kieser, despite being one of the worst perpetrators Reshid "is perceived as a patriot and martyr in official Turkish-nationalist diction".

Biography
Reshid was born on 8 February 1873 to a Circassian family; due to increasing Russian persecution, he left with his family for the Ottoman Empire in 1874.

He enrolled in the Imperial Military School of Medicine at the capital, Dersaadet, and was one of the founders of the Committee of Union and Progress (CUP). In 1894, Reshid was employed as an assistant to the German professor Düring Pasha at the Haydarpaşa hospital. When his links to the CUP were discovered by police in 1897 he was exiled to Libya. where he served as a doctor in Tripoli until 1908. When he returned to Constantinople (today Istanbul) and got promoted to Adjudant Major, he worked as a military doctor for some months but resigned from his position in the Ottoman military the following year on the 20 August 1909. He then pursued a career in state administration that on the 9 October 1909 took him as a Kaymakam to İstanköy and in February 1910 he was promoted to Mutasarrıf in Hums, Tripolis, where he worked until his removal in June 1911. From Tripoli his career led him as a Mutasarrıf  to Kozan, Lazistan and  Karesi before he was named Vali of Diyarbekir on the 13 August 1914.

Diyarbekir governorship

Over the years, Reshid became increasingly radicalized and by 1914 he was convinced that the Christians of the empire were to blame for its economic woes. During his tenure as district governor of Karesi, he had organized the forced deportation of the Ottoman Greeks (Rumlar) in the Aegean, whom he no longer considered to be faithful citizens of the empire. This policy was supported by the Ottoman Interior Minister Talat Pasha.

In 1914, the Ottoman Empire entered World War I on the side of the Central Powers and fighting erupted at the border against Russia. In the spring of 1915, the Russians advanced into Ottoman territory and the quick march of their army toward Diyarbakir, according to historian Uğur Üngör, must have confirmed Reshid's "apocalyptic fear" of the Russians and their perceptions of all Armenians to be Russian spies. Before the war, the economic and political competition between the Muslim and Christian urban elite also played an important role in the violence.

His particularly strong hatred for the empire's Armenians was made manifest in the mass murders of Armenians and Assyrians he organized in the Diyarbekir province following his accession to the governorship on 25 March 1915, at the height of World War I. Reshid had persuaded himself that the native Armenian population was conspiring against the Ottoman state and he had accordingly drawn up plans for the "solution of the Armenian question." He recounted in his memoirs:

Over the next two months the Armenians and Assyrians of the province were targeted in a brutal campaign of extermination and were wiped out by way of wholesale massacres and deportations. He established a "Committee of Inquiry" with the aim of the solution of the "Armenian Question". According to the Venezuelan officer and mercenary Rafael de Nogales, who visited the region in June 1915, Reshid had recently received a three-worded telegram from Talat Pasha to "Burn-Destroy-Kill," an order cited as official government approval of his persecution of the Christian population. He is said to have burned 800 Assyrian children alive by himself after enclosing them in a building. Nesimi Bey and Sabit Bey, the governors of the districts of Lice and Sabit, respectively, are both suspected to have been assassinated under the express orders of Reshid for their opposition to the killings. Anywhere between 144,000 and 157,000 Armenians, Assyrians, and other Christians, or 87 to 95% of the province's Christian population, were killed or deported during Reshid's tenure as governor of Diyarbekir.

When later asked by the CUP secretary general Mithat Şukru Bleda how he, as a doctor, had had the heart to send so many people to death their deaths he replied:

When asked by Bleda how history might remember him, Reshid simply responded, "Let other nations write about me whatever history they want, I couldn't care less."

Final years
Most of the jewellery and possessions Reshid had confiscated from the Armenians were, in theory, to be forwarded to the central government's treasury. Talat Pasha's concern for these valuables resulted in an investigation into Reshid for embezzlement, which found that he had amassed a personal fortune from the killings. A doctor, Hyacinth Fardjalian, attested, "I myself saw Rechid Bey arrive at Aleppo by a train bound for Constantinople with 43 boxes of jewellery and two cases of precious stones." He was transferred to Ankara province, where he assumed as the Vali between March 1916 and 1917. At this time he purchased a mansion on the Bosphorus with money stolen from murdered Armenians. When Talat found out about this, he had Reshid removed from his post. Süleyman Nazif commented, "Talat Pasha dismissed Resit as a thief, while he adored him as murderer".

He then returned to Istanbul and began a business importing perfumes. On 5 November 1918, a little less than a week after Ottoman capitulation to the Allies, Reshid was arrested and sent to Bekirağa prison in Constantinople. His role in the massacres was exposed in the Constantinople press, though he would go on to deny his actions and of ever having committed a crime. He was able to escape from the prison in January 1919, but when government authorities cornered him he committed suicide by shooting himself in the head.

Legacy
Despite his role in the destruction of the Christian communities of Diyarbekir, Reshid was embraced by the authorities of the newly established Republic of Turkey. In Ankara, a boulevard was named after him in his honour. The Ministry of Economy saw to it that his wife Mazlûme Hanım was properly cared for and in 1928 provided shops formerly belonging to deported Armenians to help support her livelihood. Reshid's family was also given two houses and, in a 1930 decree signed by President Mustafa Kemal and other members of the cabinet, was allocated further Armenian properties.

Even though he is now known as the "Butcher of Diyarbakir", Reshid claimed, during a conversation with Rafael de Nogales, to bear no legal or moral responsibility for the systematic massacre of Christians in his province, as he only followed orders from the Minister of the Interior, Talat Pasha. According to De Nogales, "Talat had ordered the slaughter by a circular telegram, if my memory is correct, containing a scant three words: Yak - Vur - Oldur, meaning, 'Burn, demolish, kill'. The authenticity of that terrible phrase was confirmed by the press of Constantinople after the Armistice with the publication of a certain telegram which the Ottoman commission engaged in investigating the massacres and deportations had discovered among the papers of the Committee of Union and Progress."

Süleyman Nazif, the former Vali of Mosul, had a very different opinion and testified after the Armistice, "The catastrophic deportations and murders in Diyarbekir were Reshid's work. He alone is responsible. He recruited people from the outside in order to perpetrate the killings. He murdered the Kaimakams in order to scare all other opposed Muslim men and women; he displayed the corpses of the Kaimakams in public."

See also
Ignatius Maloyan

Notes

Bibliography
.
.

.
.
.
.

1873 births
1919 deaths
Armenian genocide perpetrators
Political people from the Ottoman Empire
Ottoman people of World War I
People from the Ottoman Empire of Circassian descent
Suicides by firearm in Turkey
20th-century physicians from the Ottoman Empire
19th-century physicians from the Ottoman Empire
Committee of Union and Progress politicians
1919 suicides
Sayfo perpetrators